Károly Bakos (born 2 March 1943) is a Hungarian former weightlifter who competed in the 1968 Summer Olympics.

References

External links
 
 

1943 births
Living people
Hungarian male weightlifters
Olympic weightlifters of Hungary
Olympic bronze medalists for Hungary
Olympic medalists in weightlifting
Weightlifters at the 1968 Summer Olympics
Medalists at the 1968 Summer Olympics
20th-century Hungarian people
21st-century Hungarian people